Tofazzal Hossain is a Awami League politician and the former Member of Parliament of Rangpur-22.

Career
Hossain was elected to parliament from Rangpur-22 as an Awami League candidate in 1973.

References

Awami League politicians
Living people
1st Jatiya Sangsad members
People from Gaibandha District
Year of birth missing (living people)